The Kajang–Seremban Highway, KASEH  (Malay: Lebuhraya Kajang–Seremban), or LEKAS Highway, is an expressway in Malaysia connecting Kajang, Selangor to Seremban, Negeri Sembilan. The speed limits on the expressway are 80 km/h (Kajang Perdana–Kajang South and Setul–Paroi) and 110 km/h (68 mph) (all other sections).

Overview
The  expressway is designed to pass through Semenyih, Pajam, Mantin, Temiang and link to the Seremban Inner Ring Road. It serves as an effective traffic dispersal for the highly congested Kajang in Selangor to Seremban in Negeri Sembilan besides the North–South Expressway Southern Route and the Kuala Lumpur–Seremban Expressway.

The Highway Project has achieved several stages of completion.
"Package 1A" from the SILK Interchange to Kajang South has been completed and opened to the public.
"Package 1B" from the Kajang Selatan Interchange to Pajam Interchange, earthworks and major drainage have been completed.
"Packages 2A and 3" from Pajam Interchange to Paroi, all land acquisitions have been completed. Part of the alignment between Mantin Interchange and Setul Interchange has been approved for realignment.

Route background
The Kilometre Zero of the expressway starts right after the Exit 1804 Kajang Perdana Interchange which connects the expressway with the E18 Kajang Dispersal Link Expressway and the Kajang Bypass near Kajang, Selangor.

History
The project was approved by the government in 1997 and the construction of the expressway began on 2002; however, the financial problems faced by the original concessionnaire, Kajang–Seremban Highway Sdn. Bhd. (Kaseh) had forced the construction works to be delayed. The project was revitalized in November 2006 after a takeover by a new concessionnaire, Lebuhraya Kajang-Seremban Sdn. Bhd. (Lekas), which 50% of the stake was held by IJM Corporation Berhad and the rest of the stake was held by the original concessionnaire, Kajang–Seremban Highway Sdn. Bhd. This project was scheduled for completion by December 2009.

The phase 1 of the expressway connecting Kajang South to Pajam was officially opened on 23 August 2008. The main subcontractor was WCT, which then subcontracted the beam-manufacturing to Mudajaya. As a normal procedure to make users familiarize with the highway, the highway will be toll free for a month from opening.

The highway system was extended with the opening of Mantin toll plaza on 31 December 2008. Again, the main subcontractor was WCT, and the beam-manufacturer was Mudajaya. Most of the shorter beams like the Ms and Inverted Ts were manufactured at Mudajaya's production plant in Ijok, Selangor, whilst the longer and more "treacherous" I-beams were produced on the site itself. As per normal practice, the route was toll free until 30 January 2009.

On 1 March 2010, the Setul and Ampangan Interchange has been opened for traffic.

Features
Six-lane carriageway from Kajang to Setul
Medium to high speed limits of 80 km/h (Kajang Perdana–Kajang South and Setul–Paroi) and 110 km/h (all other sections)
SOS emergency phone
The Setul toll plaza is the highest toll plaza in Malaysia located at the hilly top of Gunung Mantin-Seremban at 258 metres above sea level.

Notable events

Pajam Incident
On 27 September 2007, at around 11.45 pm., eight massive I-20 beams (each weighing close to 70 tonnes) collapsed in a domino fashion at BR 7 (approximately Ch.16,400), just about a kilometre from the Pajam Interchange. There were no casualties. In the three months following the incident, the contractor constructed a 4 km. public by-pass road circumnavigating the BR 7 launch site, from the Federal Route FT3265, to the Pajam Interchange, then onto the Pajam Toll Plaza, and coming out again at FT3265 nearer to the town of Nilai, recast the eight I-20 beams, and then re-launched them. There were no public funds involved in the repair work, and all costs were borne by the contractor.
The BR 7 is now in service, and forms part of the LEKAS Highway.

Other events
17 April 2010 – Achik Spin (real name Abdillah Murad Md Shari), vocalist of the Malaysian rock band Spin, died in a car accident on the Kajang–Seremban Highway near Pajam, Negeri Sembilan.
3 May 2020 – At around 2:11 am, Koperal Safwan Muhammad Ismail, aged 31, died when a drunk driver crashed into an Op COVID-19 roadblock near the Kajang Selatan toll plaza.

Toll systems
As part of an initiative to facilitate faster transactions at all toll plazas, all toll transactions on the Kajang–Seremban Highway have been conducted electronically via Touch 'n Go cards or SmartTAGs since 2 March 2016. This is the first closed toll expressway to phase out the closed toll system.

Toll rates
(Since 1 January 2023)

Between Kajang Selatan and Setul toll plazas

Ampangan toll plaza

List of interchanges

References

External links
 IJM
 LEKAS

2008 establishments in Malaysia
Expressways in Malaysia